Teodoro Mauri Moreno (14 June 1903 – 4 July 1960) is a former Spanish football forward and manager.

Playing career
As a youth played for the Catalunya Les Corts, Europa and Júpiter until he made the leap to Espanyol. With Perico's he became a legend of the 1920s, along with Ricardo Zamora, José Padrón, Pedro Solé or Crisant Bosch.

In June 1927 he moved to Havana where he signed a one-year contract with the Club Juventud Asturiana. The Cuban team was trained by the Spanish Paco Bru, who was drafted by the Cuban regime to promote football and ensure the registration of Cuba in FIFA. Juventud also played the Spanish player Pedro Colls. And even in the expedition traveled the Spanish referee José Llovera to referee matches in the country of Cuba.

In the 1929 season played in Castellón in the third level in a new league format nationally, and even took over the team as coach.

Coaching career
As a coach got coaches in La Liga with Hércules, fell to second division at this season. Castellón was the club where good records left as coach. Directed him in three different stages. In the 1940-41 season he was champion of the Second division and managed the first ascent of club to La Liga.

References

External links
 

1903 births
1960 deaths
Spanish footballers
Footballers from Barcelona
Association football forwards
Spanish expatriate footballers
Expatriate footballers in Cuba
Spanish expatriate sportspeople in Cuba
CE Europa footballers
RCD Espanyol footballers
CD Castellón footballers
Spanish football managers
La Liga managers
CD Castellón managers
Hércules CF managers
Cádiz CF managers
UE Figueres managers
RCD Mallorca managers
Catalonia international footballers
Tercera División managers
Segunda División managers